Road of Hell may refer to:

 Road of Hell (1931 film), a 1931 American drama film
 Road of Hell (1946 film), a 1946 Argentinian film
 Road of Hell (1951 film), a 1951 Mexican thriller film